Highway 695 is a highway in the Canadian province of Saskatchewan. It runs from Highway 3 to Highway 793 near Victoire.

Highway 695 passes near the community of Shell Lake, and passes through the Big River Indian reserve.

See also 
Roads in Saskatchewan
Transportation in Saskatchewan

References 

695